Marek Švec (born 31 December 2003) is a professional Slovak footballer who currently plays for FK Dubnica as a forward, on loan from FC ViOn Zlaté Moravce.

Club career

FC ViOn Zlaté Moravce
Švec made his Fortuna Liga debut for ViOn Zlaté Moravce against DAC Dunajská Streda on 13 March 2021.

References

External links
 FC ViOn Zlaté Moravce official club profile 
 
 Futbalnet profile 
 

2003 births
Living people
People from Partizánske
Sportspeople from the Trenčín Region
Slovak footballers
Slovakia youth international footballers
Association football forwards
FC ViOn Zlaté Moravce players
FK Dubnica players
Slovak Super Liga players